The eighth season of the television series, Law & Order: Special Victims Unit premiered September 19, 2006 and ended May 22, 2007 on NBC. The series remained in its 10pm/9c Tuesday timeslot. With the introduction of a new partner for Detective Stabler, early episodes of season 8 took on a significantly different focus when compared to those of previous seasons.

Production
The eighth season began filming when Mariska Hargitay was in the final stages of her pregnancy. As a result, two episodes "Informed" and "Scheherazade" made use of desks, folders, and headshots to disguise Benson's abdomen. "Informed" became the season premiere but "Scheherazade" was not incorporated into the plot until 2007. The episode "Burned" was directed by Eriq LaSalle, who worked with Neal Baer and Mariska Hargitay on ER. He described the episode as "a compelling story with edgy performances."

When writing the episode "Responsible", Neal Baer stated that he referred to "an article about... how there's been leaps in terms of research about the effects of alcohol on teenage brains." Judith McCreary stated that information she used to write "Confrontation" came from a Google search; "I ran across a story about women who were raped more than once by the same guy and that made me wonder if his biological clock was ticking." Diane Neal joked about the writers' penchant for disturbing web searches, saying "I'm sure a couple of the writers are on the feds' most wanted Internet predators list too, because they're doing all this research on pedophilia."

Judith McCreary also wrote the season finale "Screwed", during which illegal activities involving the detectives are brought up in the courtroom. She said "I wanted to explore chickens coming home to roost. A lot of shit these cops have been doing they haven't paid for. Benson committed a felony; she should've been kicked off the force and gone to prison."

Cast changes and returning characters
During a six episode absence by Mariska Hargitay, Connie Nielsen was cast to play Stabler's temporary partner, Detective Dani Beck. Dick Wolf said that he was "thrilled that we have someone of Connie's obvious talent, beauty and stature to come in for these episodes. It doesn't get any better than this."

Chris "Ludacris" Bridges made his second appearance on SVU in "Screwed" which concludes the seventh season episode "Venom". Neal Baer explained that he saw this episode as an opportunity to have Adam Beach's character, Detective Chester Lake, become a longer term addition to the show; "Chris causes Ice-T's character Fin major, major, major problems that go back many years. While everything is in disarray, SVU needs some extra hands and Adam's character is brought in to help out."

Three episodes in the second half of the season starred Michael Weston as Simon Marsden, Olivia's half brother. Hargitay described this storyline as "probably the biggest thing that's ever happened to Olivia." The episode in which Marsden is introduced features an appearance by Mary Stuart Masterson in her recurring role of Dr. Rebecca Hendrix.

Cast

Main cast
 Christopher Meloni as Senior Detective Elliot Stabler
 Mariska Hargitay as Junior Detective Olivia Benson
 Richard Belzer as Senior Detective John Munch
 Ice-T as Junior Detective Odafin "Fin" Tutuola
 Diane Neal as Assistant District Attorney Casey Novak
 BD Wong as FBI Special Agent Dr. George Huang
 Tamara Tunie as Medical Examiner Dr. Melinda Warner
 Dann Florek as Captain Donald "Don" Cragen

Recurring cast

 Mike Doyle as Crime Scene Unit Forensics Technician Ryan O'Halloran
 Allison Siko as Kathleen Stabler
 Isabel Gillies as Kathy Stabler
 Joel de la Fuente as Technical Assistance Response Unit Technician Ruben Morales
 Judith Light as Judge Elizabeth Donnelly
 Caren Browning as Crime Scene Unit Captain Judith Siper
 Peter McRobbie as Judge Walter Bradley
 Jill Marie Lawrence as Defense Attorney Cleo Conrad
 Michael Weston as Simon Marsden
 Vincent Spano as FBI Special Agent Dean Porter
 Jeffrey Scaperrotta as Dickie Stabler
 Patricia Cook as Elizabeth Stabler
 Linda Powell as Lauren White

 David Lipman as Judge Arthur Cohen
 Karl Kenzler as Father Denis
 Peter Gerety as Judge Peter Harrison
 Anne James as Dr. Jane Larom
 David Dollase as FBI Agent Lockwood
 Lisa Strum as Tonya Majeski
 Ali Reza as Dr. Rohit Mehta
 Kim Delaney as Interim Captain Julia Millfield
 Joanna Merlin as Judge Lena Petrovsky
 Ernest Waddell as Ken Randall
 Erin Broderick as Maureen Stabler
 Patricia Kalember as Judge Karen Taten
 Connie Nielsen as Detective Dani Beck

Guest stars

The season premiere "Informed" saw Marcia Gay Harden reprise her role as Special Agent Dana Lewis, for which she received an Emmy nomination. Acting opposite was Kristen Bush, who shaved her head for the role. After agreeing to do this, Bush said "It was a kind of tenuous connection as to why she was shaved. I probably should have investigated it more, but whatever." The Primetime Emmy Award for Outstanding Guest Actress in a Drama Series was won by Leslie Caron for her performance in the third episode "Recall". Caron played Lorraine Delmas, a rape victim whose statute of limitations is long over. However, her testimony gets newer evidence admitted after her rapist strikes again. Caron's scene, which was spoken predominantly in French, was described as "a rare appearance in front of American cameras."

Jerry Lewis guest starred in the fourth episode "Uncle". He played Andrew Munch, the uncle of Detective John Munch. Neal Baer promoted the episode by saying "He brings both depth and heart to this role and gives insight into how often older people with depression are misdiagnosed." In the fifth episode "Confrontation", Elanor Hutchins played Elizabeth Hassenback, a woman who was raped and later murdered. Elisabeth Hasselbeck, co-host of The View, objected to the use of a name that was similar to her own and called for a boycott of SVU based on this. With the sixth episode "Infiltrated", Vincent Spano began playing FBI Agent Dean Porter, the case agent for Detective Benson's undercover work. The character would go on to cross paths with SVU detectives again in later episodes. In the seventh episode "Underbelly", Diane Neal had a scene with her husband Marcus Fitzgerald who played an ADA.

In the eighth episode "Cage", Margo Martindale played Rita Gabler, a foster parent whose methods have a devastating effect on a young girl. Neal Baer continued to praise her performance and in 2011 said "I know how good she is because when I did SVU, she put Elle Fanning in a cage and told her to set Connie Nielsen on fire." The ninth episode "Choreographed" marked the return of Mariska Hargitay's character to the Special Victims Unit. The episode starred Bob Saget as a suspicious husband. Hargitay expressed her excitement about working with Saget and called him "America's biggest secret." The tenth episode guest starred Paget Brewster as the secretly adopted/stolen daughter of a man who has a criminal past and days to live. The episode shows Benson spending time with the man, as he bluntly tells her and Stabler character, the stories of his crimes, and how Sheila (Brewster) came to be his daughter. The eleventh episode "Burned" starred Michael Michele as an alleged rape victim who gains the sympathy of Detective Benson but not Detective Stabler. This reunited her with Eriq LaSalle, Neal Baer and Mariska Hargitay from her time on ER. LaSalle, who directed the episode, joked that "It also gave [him] an excuse to boss Michael Michele around."

The twelfth episode "Outsider" starred Kal Penn as a rapist following an unusual pattern. "Outsider" also introduced Adam Beach to the show; his character forms a temporary partnership with Detective Tutuola. Neal Baer described the guest stars as bringing "some funny moments to SVU" and also applauded the tension shown between Adam Beach and Ice-T. Kelli Giddish, who played one of the victims would later join the show as Det. Amanda Rollins beginning at Season 13. Bill Goldberg appeared at the beginning of the thirteenth episode "Loophole". Wrestler Bill Goldberg is Neal Baer's cousin and was given a physically intimidating role. The fourteenth episode "Dependent" featured guest star Cary Elwes as mafia lawyer Sidney Truex, who survives an attack in his home where his wife is murdered. It is later revealed that the boyfriend of Truex's 16-year-old daughter is the murderer. The sixteenth episode "Philadelphia" showed Detective Benson clashing with a New Jersey cop played by Kim Delaney. Delaney mentioned being an SVU fan especially because of the subject matter addressed in the show and said "It's what we read about in the paper, unfortunately too many times."

The third last episode "Annihilated" was predicted to be an Emmy contender for Christopher Meloni in the Envelope section of The LA Times. Dylan Walsh guest starred as Malcolm Royce, a family man involved in a murder suicide. Meloni described Walsh's character as "outwardly a family man like Elliot, who has everything going for him, but this guy's living a double life." In the second last episode "Pretend", Misti Traya guest starred as a woman who had been posing as a teenager for years. Noting the similarities, Neal Baer said the writers were "stunned" to hear about the sex offender Neil Havens Rodreick who was caught disguising himself as a twelve-year-old shortly after the episode was written. In the season finale "Screwed", Chris "Ludacris" Bridges concluded the storyline of his character Darius Parker by defending himself in court. Baer described his performance saying "He defends himself which is cool. So now he takes on the role of a lawyer with Steven Weber playing his lawyer as well."

Episodes

References

Bibliography

External links
 Law & Order: Special Victims Unit Season 8 at TVGuide.com
 Law & Order: Special Victims Unit Season 8 - TV IV
 Season 8 episodes at IMDb.com

08
2006 American television seasons
2007 American television seasons